Hyperthyroxinemia is a thyroid disease where the serum levels of thyroxine are higher than expected.

The term is sometimes used to refer to hyperthyroidism, but hyperthyroidism is a more general term.

Types include:
 Familial dysalbuminemic hyperthyroxinemia
 Familial euthyroid hyperthyroxinemia
 Thyroid hormone resistance syndrome

References

External links 

Thyroid disease